This article is about the demographic features of the population of the Northern Mariana Islands, including population density, ethnicity, education level, health of the populace, economic status, religious affiliations and other aspects of the population.

CIA World Factbook demographic statistics 

The following demographic statistics are from the CIA World Factbook

Population
51,433

Age structure
0–14 years: 25.02% (male 6,937/female 5,934)
15–24 years: 16.28% (male 4,518/female 3,857)
25–54 years: 37.44% (male 9,934/female 9,325)
55–64 years: 14.01% (male 3,921/female 3,286)
65 years and over: 7.23% (male 1,988/female 1,733) (2020 est.)

Population growth rate
 -0.55%

Birth rate
15.1 births/1,000 population

Death rate
5.3 deaths/1,000 population

Net migration rate
-15.4 migrant(s)/1,000 population

Sex ratio
At birth: 1.16 male(s)/female
0–14 years: 1.17 male(s)/female
15–24 years: 1.17 male(s)/female
25–54 years: 1.07 male(s)/female
55–64 years: 1.19 male(s)/female
65 years and over: 1.15 male(s)/female
Total population: 1.13 male(s)/female (2020 est.)

Infant mortality rate
Total: 11.5 deaths/1,000 live births
Male: 13.7 deaths/1,000 live births
Female: 9 deaths/1,000 live births (2020 est.)

Total fertility rate
2.7 children born/woman

Nationality
noun: NA (US citizens)
adjective: NA

Ethnic groups
Asian 50% (includes Filipino 35.3%, Chinese 6.8%, Korean 4.2%, and other Asian 3.7%)
Native Hawaiian or other Pacific Islander 34.9% (includes Chamorro 23.9%, Carolinian people 4.6%, and other Native Hawaiian or Pacific Islander 6.4%),
Other 2.5%, two or more ethnicities or races 12.7% (2010 est.)

Religion
According to the Pew Research Center, 2010:

Roman Catholic 64.1%
Protestants 16%
Buddhists 10.6%
Folk religions 5.3%
Other Christians 1.2%
Other religions 1.1%
Unaffiliated 1.0%
Muslim 0.7%
Eastern Orthodox <1%
Hindu <1%
Jews <1%

Languages
Philippine languages 32.8%
Chamorro (official) 24.1%
English (official) 17%
Other Pacific island languages 10.1%
Chinese 6.8%
Other Asian languages 7.3%
Other 1.9%

See also
Northern Mariana citizenship and nationality

References

CIA World Factbook

 
Northern Mariana Islands
Society of the Northern Mariana Islands